Isle Brewers is a village and parish in Somerset, England, situated on the River Isle,  south east of Taunton in the South Somerset district.  The village has a population of 150. The parish includes the hamlet of North Bradon.

History
The first part of the name of the village comes from the River Isle, which separates the parish from Isle Abbotts and the second from the family of William Brewer (Briwere) who were the lords of the manor in the early 13th century.

Governance
The parish council has responsibility for local issues, including setting an annual precept (local rate) to cover the council's operating costs and producing annual accounts for public scrutiny. The parish council evaluates local planning applications and works with the local police, district council officers, and neighbourhood watch groups on matters of crime, security, and traffic. The parish council's role also includes initiating projects for the maintenance and repair of parish facilities, as well as consulting with the district council on the maintenance, repair, and improvement of highways, drainage, footpaths, public transport, and street cleaning. Conservation matters (including trees and listed buildings) and environmental issues are also the responsibility of the council.

The village falls within the Non-metropolitan district of South Somerset, which was formed on 1 April 1974 under the Local Government Act 1972, having previously been part of Langport Rural District. The district council is responsible for local planning and building control, local roads, council housing, environmental health, markets and fairs, refuse collection and recycling, cemeteries and crematoria, leisure services, parks, and tourism.

Somerset County Council is responsible for running the largest and most expensive local services such as education, social services, libraries, main roads, public transport, policing and  fire services, trading standards, waste disposal and strategic planning.

It is also part of the Yeovil county constituency represented in the House of Commons of the Parliament of the United Kingdom. It elects one Member of Parliament (MP) by the first past the post system of election.

Parish church
The Anglican parish church of All Saints was built in 1861 by Charles Edmund Giles. The original Church of All Saints stood near the Domesday mill, and the current building was funded by the vicar Joseph Wolff, a Jewish Christian missionary of German ancestry who converted to Catholicism, before being ordained in the Anglican church. He later died in the village.

References

Villages in South Somerset
Civil parishes in Somerset